Destiny Is Yours is an album led by saxophonist Billy Harper recorded in 1989 and released on the SteepleChase label.

Reception

In his review for AllMusic, Greg Turner states "the vastly under-recognized Harper is a master tenor saxophonist who has developed a unique sound on his chosen instrument, sometimes very passionate, sometimes very lyrical. His compositions, characterized by shifting tempos and themes played over insistent vamps, always have a spiritual, uplifting quality to them. ...This is a perfect introduction to the artist's music. ".

Track listing
All compositions by Billy Harper except as indicated
 "Destiny Is Yours" - 12:44
 "East-West Exodus" - 13:46
 "Dance in the Question" (Francesca Tanksley) - 11:06 Bonus track on CD release
 "My Funny Valentine" (Lorenz Hart, Richard Rodgers) - 5:21 Bonus track on CD release
 "The One That Makes the Rain Stop" - 10:36 		
 "If Only One Could See" - 4:33
 "Groove from Heaven" - 10:55

Personnel 
Billy Harper - tenor saxophone
Eddie Henderson - trumpet
Francesca Tanksley - piano
Clarence Seay - bass
Newman Taylor Baker - drums

References 

1990 albums
Billy Harper albums
SteepleChase Records albums